Northshore Academy Upper School is a public alternative high school in Beverly, Massachusetts, United States, serving students in grades 712.

References

External links

Public high schools in Massachusetts
Schools in Beverly, Massachusetts